John Layton Cuthbertson (born 24 February 1942 in Bombay, India) is an English former first-class cricketer active 1962–63 who played for Surrey and Oxford University. He also played hockey for Surrey and Oxford University.

References

1942 births
Living people
English cricketers
Surrey cricketers
Oxford University cricketers
People educated at Rugby School
Alumni of Worcester College, Oxford